Gascoigne Bluff is a bluff next to the Frederica River on the western side of the island of St. Simons, Georgia which was a Native American campground, the site of a Franciscan monastery named San Buenaventura, and the site of the Province of Georgia's first naval base.

It was named for Captain James Gascoigne of the sloop-of-war, HMS Hawk, which led some of the first British settlers to the coast of Georgia.

Timber harvested from 2,000 Southern live oak trees from Gascoigne Bluff was used to build the USS Constitution and the five other original US Navy frigates, under the Naval Act of 1794.  The Constitution is known as "Old Ironsides" for the way the cannonballs bounced off the hard oak planking.

This area was one of several St. Simons Island plantations owned by John Couper (father of James Hamilton Couper, see below) who lived at Cannon Point, St. Simons Island, and who donated his library of 20,000 volumes to the Library of Congress.

Hamilton Plantation 

The remains of this antebellum-era plantation contain two surviving slave cabins, which were part of a set of four built before 1833. Among the better examples of surviving slave cabins in the South, they are composed of tabby, a cement consisting of lime, water, and crushed oyster shells. The cabins have built-in windows and a central chimney.

James Hamilton Couper, namesake of the owner and manager of the plantation, was an architect and a builder. He designed and built the cabins to house the slaves who served in the plantation's main house. Utilizing a duplex plan to house more than one family, the cabins were originally part of a planned community of slave dwellings.

The Hamilton Plantation and Gasciogne Bluff were sold after the Civil War to Anson Dodge and the Georgia Land and Lumber Company of New York in 1874 to erect lumber mills.

The Cassina Garden Club owns the cabins and offers tours on Wednesday mornings in June through August.  The cabins are near Arthur J. Moore Drive.

See also
National Register of Historic Places listings in Glynn County, Georgia

Further reading

References

External links 
Cassina Garden Club owns the Hamilton Plantation slave cabins and provides tours.
Golden Isles Navigator page about the location
A ministry site which maintains a history of the area
The National Park Service maintains a web page about Hamilton Plantation.
Cassina Garden Club slave cabins
Cassina Garden Club Houses historical marker
Hamilton Plantation historical marker
 

Slave cabins and quarters in the United States
Landforms of Glynn County, Georgia
Landforms of Georgia (U.S. state)
Cliffs of the United States
Plantations in Georgia (U.S. state)
St. Simons, Georgia